St. James Academy is a Catholic high school in Lenexa, Kansas, United States.  It is part of the Roman Catholic Archdiocese of Kansas City in Kansas. It is the only high school located in the city of Lenexa, but there are three public school districts that serve the city.

History
The school was established in 2005.  The school was named after St. James the Greater.  The campus was named after Archbishop Emeritus James Patrick Keleher.

Extracurricular activities

Athletics and activities
St. James Academy offers a variety of sports and activities for its students. They are classified as a 5A school, according to Kansas State High School Activities Association.

State championships 

A list of sports offered at St. James are listed below:

Fall Sports
 Cross country running
 Clay target shooting
 Dance and Cheer
 Football
 Golf (Girls)
 Soccer (Boys)
 Tennis (Girls)
 Volleyball

Winter Sports
 Basketball
 Bowling
 Swimming & Diving (Boys)
 Wrestling

Spring Sports
 Baseball
 Clay target shooting
 Boys Golf
 Soccer (Girls)
 Softball
 Swimming & Diving (Girls)
 Track & Field
 Tennis (Boys)

St. James Academy also has competitive teams in Debate, Forensics, Scholars Bowl, and Science Olympiad.

Broadcasting
A number of St. James Academy sports are broadcast by webcast through the Thunder Broadcasting Network. Also called "TBN", Thunder Broadcasting Network is operated by its student members, who serve as commentators, producers, sideline reporters, camera operators, and sound engineers. Students may also keep statistics during the game to aid the on-air commentary, as well as post to the social media accounts for the Athletics and Activities Department. TBN also broadcasts some school Masses, events of its Community System, student theatre, as well as vocal and instrumental concerts.

St. James Academy also produces a student-run studio journalism project known as the Weekly Storm.

See also
 List of unified school districts in Kansas

References

External links
 

2005 establishments in Kansas
Educational institutions established in 2005
Catholic secondary schools in Kansas
Private high schools in Kansas
Roman Catholic Archdiocese of Kansas City in Kansas
Schools in Johnson County, Kansas